The World Car Awards (formerly World Car of the Year, WCOTY) is a group of automobile Car of the Year awards selected by a jury of 82 international automotive journalists from 24 countries. Cars considered must be sold in at least five countries, on at least two continents prior to 1 January of the year of the award. The contest was inaugurated in 2003, and officially launched in January 2004.

This started as a single award, similar to many of the continent and nation specific Car of the Year awards already given. Since 2006, awards for performance, green cars, and car design have also been given. In April 2013, an award for luxury design was inaugurated.

History

2005
Ten finalists were reduced to three, before the winner was selected at the Canadian International AutoShow in Toronto. The Audi A6, Porsche 911, and Volvo S40/V50 were the top three finalists.

2006
For 2006, in addition to the WCOTY award, the performance, green, and design categories were added; the award was announced at the New York International Auto Show. The BMW 3 Series, Mazda MX-5, and Porsche Cayman were the top three finalists.

2007
The Lexus LS, MINI, and Audi TT were the top three finalists. The winner was announced at the New York International Auto Show.

2008
The Mazda2 / Demio, Ford Mondeo, and Mercedes-Benz C-Class were the top three finalists. The winner was announced at the New York International Auto Show.

2009
The Volkswagen Golf, and Toyota iQ were the top three finalists. The winner was announced at the New York International Auto Show.

2010
The Volkswagen Polo, Mercedes-Benz E-Class, and Audi A5 were the top three finalists. The winner was announced at the New York International Auto Show.

2011
The Nissan Leaf, Audi A8, and BMW 5 Series were the top three finalists. The winner was announced at the New York International Auto Show.

2012
The Volkswagen up!, BMW 3 Series, and Porsche 911 were the top three finalists. The winner was announced at the New York International Auto Show.

2013
The Volkswagen Golf, Mercedes-Benz A-Class, Porsche Boxster and Subaru BRZ/Toyota GT-86 were the top four finalists. The winner was announced at the New York International Auto Show.

2014
The Audi A3, Mazda3 and BMW 4 Series were the top three finalists. The winner was announced at the New York International Auto Show.

2015
The Mercedes-Benz C-Class, Volkswagen Passat and Ford Mustang were the top three finalists. The winner was announced at the New York International Auto Show.

2016
The Mazda MX-5, Mercedes-Benz GLC and Audi A4 were the top three finalists. The winner was announced at the New York International Auto Show.

2017
The Jaguar F-Pace, Volkswagen Tiguan and Audi Q5 were the top three finalists. The winner was announced at the New York International Auto Show.

2018
The Volvo XC60, Range Rover Velar and Mazda CX-5 were the top three finalists. The winner was announced at the New York International Auto Show.

2019
The Audi e-tron, Jaguar I-Pace and Volvo S60/V60 are the top three finalists. The winner was announced at the New York International Auto Show.

Results

Winners

Finalists and top 3

Total wins by makers

See also

 List of motor vehicle awards

References

External links
 Official website
 List of winners
 Cars of the year

Motor vehicle awards